Thaungdut is a village on the Chindwin River in Homalin Township in Hkamti District in the Sagaing Region of northwestern Burma. It is located next to Chaunggan.

History

Originally, Thaungdut (Hsawnghsup) was one of the Shan States ruled by Shan saophas, but later it became part of Shan State.

References

External links
Maplandia World Gazetteer

Populated places in Hkamti District
Homalin Township